Amalie John Hathaway was a German-American philosopher and lecturer, who contributed to the pessimism controversy in Germany.

Life and work 
Hathaway was born in Mühlhausen, Germany. She moved with her family to Wisconsin when she was 12 and ran a country school from the age of 15, as a source of income. She was introduced to philosophy by the lecturer Benjamin Cocker who brought to her attention the works of "German metaphysicians and philosophers", including Kant, Hegel, Schopenhauer and Von Hartmann, which she could read and understand in their original language. While pursuing her studies, she met Benjamin Hathaway, a self-taught poet, horticulturalist and nurseryman, who became her husband. The couple regularly attended The Philosophical Society of Chicago, where Hathaway's contributions lead to her being invited to deliver her own lecture.

Hathaway's one publication "Schopenhauer", an 18-page paper published in Education, was based on a lecture delivered before the Concord School of Philosophy, which was reported on by The New York Times. The lecture received positive press coverage elsewhere, with Hathaway described as "probably by far the best grounded in philosophy among American women" by the Republican. Her other papers (unpublished) were "Immanuel Kant", "The Hegelian Philosophy", "Hartmann", "Pessimism and the Hegelian Philosophy" and "Mental Automatism".

Legacy 
Hathaway has been described as a "new lost woman philosopher", having been barely given any attention by the "feminist philosophical recovery movement". She has also been described as an unrecognised contributor to the German pessimism controversy. Hathaway has been compared to the contemporary women philosophers who also contributed to the controversy, Agnes Taubert and Olga Plümacher.

An article on Hathaway, by Carol Bensick, is set to be included in the forthcoming Oxford Handbook of American and British Women Philosophers in the Nineteenth Century.

Publications

References 

Year of birth unknown
Year of death unknown
19th-century American philosophers
19th-century German philosophers
American women philosophers
German emigrants to the United States
German women philosophers
Lecturers
People from Mühlhausen